was one of the administrative divisions of Japanese Taiwan. The prefecture consisted of modern-day Taichung City, Changhua County and Nantou County. It is also the origin of the name of modern-day Taichung. The Taichū Prefecture was the scene of the 1930 Musha Incident, the last major uprising against colonial Japanese forces in Japanese Taiwan.

Population

Administrative divisions

Cities and Districts 
In 1945 (Shōwa 20), there were 2 cities and 11 districts.

Towns and Villages 
The districts are divided into towns (街) and villages (庄)

See also 
 Political divisions of Taiwan (1895–1945)
 Governor-General of Taiwan
 Taiwan under Japanese rule
 Administrative divisions of the Republic of China

References 

Former prefectures of Japan in Taiwan